Ernesto Fonseca, also known as "El Lobito" and "The Fonz", is a retired professional motocross and supercross racer from Costa Rica.

Background
Born on September 3, 1981, in San José, Costa Rica, Fonseca began riding dirt bikes at the age of 5. By the time he was 12 years old, his talent on a motorcycle led him to the United States to race in mini classes. After much success, Fonseca decided to move up to the 125cc Pro class in Costa Rica, where the other top Costa Rican motocross racers, such as Adrian Robert, Rodolfo Peña had tough battles for the championship.

At first, there was a little controversy since MotoClub de Costa Rica has a rule, that the minimum age to ride 125's was 17. In the end M.C.C.R. modified this rule and Fonseca was perfectly legal in the 125cc class. It was in his first exhibition race in la Guácima where Fonseca showed his talent by beating Adrian Robert. From here on, Ernesto and Adrian Robert were the fans favorites and the all time contenders for the 125cc & 250cc class titles, battling one each other race after race. Ernesto's dominance also gave him several 125cc Latin American motocross championships. Fonseca kept a busy schedule competing in winter Olympics and Loretta Lynn's amateur motocross championships where he met his long-time friend Ricky Carmichael. In 1999, Phil Alderton and Erik Kehoe of Yamaha of Troy would hire him to race the AMA Supercross Series East.

It was just matter of time for Fonseca to step up to AMA motocross. AMA Pro Racing, and Yamaha of Troy (Y.O.T.), embraced him and made him feel at home. A confidence boost for Ernesto was also that he was understudy of names like Jeremy McGrath, Jimmy Button & others.

That season he had certainly proven himself, winning the first five rounds of the series, and the championship. For this, Fonseca was named the 1999 AMA Rookie of the Year award and he went on to win the 125 East division championship (first championship for Yamaha of Troy as a Team) aboard a Yamaha YZ125. Ernesto's second season at Y.O.T. was full of struggles as he adapted from two to four-stroke bikes. In his third season, now accustomed to his four-stroke bike and the different riding it requires, he went on to win the west conference championship. He became the first rider to win both East and West division championships.

As AMA rules state a rider must move to the 250cc Supercross class if they have won two 125cc Supercross championships, Fonseca joined the American Honda factory racing team in 2002 joining long-time friend Ricky Carmichael. At Honda, Carmichael helped Ernesto immensely, helping him improve in the outdoor motocross championship. This was reflected by Fonseca usually finishing in the top five.

Fonseca's career came to an end due to a practice crash that broke cervicals C5, C6 and C7. Ernesto Fonseca, a tough rider, remains a Costa Rican motocross legend.

Injury
As well known as the dangers of motocross are, the entire motocross world was stunned to hear on March 7, 2006, Ernesto was injured while practicing on his private track. Landing on his head, he fractured the C-7 vertebrae and bruised his spine. Just two days after the accident, doctors performed what was described as a successful surgery and on April 13, 2006, he was transferred to Colorado for rehabilitation. 

The accident left Ernesto without any feeling from the chest down, and at only 25 years old, the sport has suffered the loss of one of its brightest stars. Known for his charming and charismatic personality, and having genuine appreciation for his career, thousands show their support for him sending cards, letters, and pictures from all over the world.

On May 5, 2006, The Road 2 Recovery Foundation paired up with the Women's Motocross & Supercross Foundation for their Seventh Annual 'Slots of Golf' Supercross Celebrity Golf Classic, to benefit Fonseca. The event pairs celebrities of the sport with fans for a golf game at Badlands Golf Course.

On May 21, 2006, the Dirt Diggers North MC, promoter of the AMA National Hangtown Motocross Classic, started a recovery fund for Fonseca, presenting him with a check at the AMA National at Thunder Valley in CO that summer. The Dirt Diggers North MC, through the Hangtown Motocross Classic, will continue to accept donations to Fonseca at its annual event.

Career overview

2005
6th AMA 250 Supercross Series
3rd AMA 250 National Motocross Series

2004
27th AMA 250 Supercross Series [missed most of season due to injury]
5th AMA 250 National Motocross Series

2003
3rd AMA 250 Supercross Series
8th AMA 250 National Motocross Series

2002
7th AMA 250 Supercross Series
4th AMA 125 National Motocross Series

2001
1st AMA 125 Western Region Supercross Series
8th AMA 125 East/West Supercross Shootout
3rd AMA 125 National Motocross Series

2000
5th AMA 125 Eastern Region Supercross Series
7th AMA 125 National Motocross Series

1999
1st AMA 125 Eastern Region Supercross Series
8th AMA 125 National Motocross Series
1999 AMA Rookie of the Year

He was a judge when the X fighter Jeremy Lusk died

External links
 
 

1981 births
Living people
Paralympic athletes of Costa Rica
Sportspeople from San José, Costa Rica
Costa Rican motocross riders
People with paraplegia
Athletes (track and field) at the 2020 Summer Paralympics